Raphespinal tract may refer to:

 Anterior raphespinal tract
 Lateral raphespinal tract